Drifting is an unincorporated community in Clearfield County, Pennsylvania, United States. Drifting has a post office with ZIP code 16834, which opened on December 6, 1895.

References

Unincorporated communities in Clearfield County, Pennsylvania
Unincorporated communities in Pennsylvania